Nacoleia phaeopasta is a moth in the family Crambidae. It was described by George Hampson in 1912. It is found on the Solomon Islands.

References

Moths described in 1912
Taxa named by George Hampson
Nacoleia
Moths of Oceania